Tur is a genus of mites in the family Laelapidae.

Species
 Tur amazonicus      
 Tur apicalis      
 Tur aymara      
 Tur lativentralis      
 Tur megistoproctus Gettinger & Bergallo, 2003     
 Tur turki Fonseca     
 Tur uniscutatus

References

Laelapidae